The Kaeng Krachan Dam is a multi-purpose hydroelectric dam in the Kaeng Krachan District of Phetchaburi Province, Thailand. The dam impounds the Phetchaburi River. It was officially opened in 1966 by King Bhumibol and Queen Sirikit.

Description
Kaeng Krachan Dam is an earth dam.

The dam is considered multi-purpose, supporting electricity generation, irrigation, water supply, fisheries and recreation activities. The islands in the reservoir were local hills prior to their submergence.

Power plant
The dam's power plant has a single hydroelectric generating unit with an installed capacity of 19 MW. The annual power generation is 70 GWh.

References

Dams in Thailand
Rock-filled dams
Hydroelectric power stations in Thailand
Dams completed in 1966
1966 establishments in Thailand
Energy infrastructure completed in 1966
Buildings and structures in Phetchaburi province